Edward Coxere (1633–1694) was a Kentish merchant seaman, linguist, Quaker convert and autobiographer.

His manuscript autobiography surfaced in 1943 and was edited by E. H. W. Meyerstein and published by Oxford University Press in 1945 as Adventures by Sea. The small-format book has a map of Europe and North Africa as its end-papers. The text has 19 pages of prelims and 110 pages of text and 22 pages of notes, together with a sourced genealogical table. There are seven illustrations derived from the original manuscript.

The Oxford Dictionary of National Biography article characterises Coxere's autobiography thus: "His picaresque narrative, written in or after 1685, is one of the most vivid accounts of seafaring life, revealing an intelligent, brave and quick-witted man, hardened by danger and adversity but retaining both humour and humanity.".

After his conversion to the Quaker faith, he suffered several terms of imprisonment, including a long period in Dover Castle.

It is likely that his surname was pronounced "Coxery".

References

Further reading
For a review of The Adventure . . .  by Henry J Cadbury, see Bulletin of Friends Historical Studies, Vol. 35 (1946), p. 79-80.

1633 births
1694 deaths
British Merchant Navy personnel
Converts to Quakerism
English diarists
English Quakers
People from Dover, Kent